Ropeways in Nepal, which mainly refers to the aerial ropeways, are used for human and cargo transport. In the ‘Nepal Country Report’ of 1976 by the world bank concluded that construction and maintenance of roads in mountainous are costly due to hilly terrain,  and thus other means of transport should be studied mainly indicating to the ropeways. However, ropeways have not gained significant popularity over roadways. In the Ninth Five-year Plan ropeway was encouraged with and involvement of the private sector. But no provision in the national budget was made for ropeway development. Nonetheless, private sector has initiated the construction and operation of ropeways mainly in lucrative places such as religious temple.

History
The first ropeway to carry cargo was Halchowk-Lainchour ropeway which was used to transport stones from the quarry to build palaces. The famous,  Dhorsing-chisapnai-Chandragiri ropeway passing into Kathmandu was built by Chandra Shamser Rana in 1922. It was upgraded in 1964 to reach to Hetauda with a total length of 42 km with technical and financial assistance from USAID.

Types of ropeways in Nepal
Following are the types of ropeways based on the operation mechanism and types of transport.

Tar pul or Ghirling 
Also known as twin, this kind of ropeways are rudimentary ropeways that are used as a bridge to cross the river. These are generally made by the local community based on necessity. As of May 2004, there are 25 Tar Pul in Kavre, Gorkha, Myagdi, Udaypur, Chitwan and Lamjung

Gravity Ropeways
Gravity ropeway operates by using potential energy without electricity. A certain weight is dropped from higher elevation which pulls the smaller cargo from lower elevation to higher elevation.
This kind of ropeways was first used in Mustang to transportation apple. Since then it has made its way to four other locations, Gorkha, Tanahun, Kalikot and Achham.
Most of the construction ropeways fall in this category.

Cargo Ropeways
Cargo ropeways are used in Nepal to transport goods from one place to another. The first ropeway, Halchowk-Lainchour,  was in fact a cargo ropeway. The most famous cargo ropeway was the Kathmandu-Hetauda Ropeway which is now out of operation.

Passenger ropeways
Mostly electrically operated, these kinds of ropeways, also called Cable Car is used to transport passengers. The first of this kind of ropeways was Manakamana Cable Car established in 1998.

List of ropeways in Nepal

Projects under consideration
 Birethanti to Muktinath (3,800 m long)

Accidents and safety
In cargo type ropeways, accidents are not fatal but include falling off of the bucket as in Adhi Khola ropeway and Jimruk Khola ropeways 
Four people riding in the ropeway car died when the hauling cable snapped on 7 May 1999 at Bhapak Ropeway.
Chandragiri cable car stopped mid air for 10 minutes twice and 40 minutes in separate occasions in 2020 causing panic by passengers.

See also
Manakamana Cable Car 
Chandragiri Cable Car
Transportation in Nepal

References

Aerial tramways in Nepal